Mường Chà is a commune-level town (thị trấn) and capital of Mường Chà District of Điện Biên Province, northwestern Vietnam. Mường is equivalent to Mueang.

References

Townships in Vietnam
Populated places in Điện Biên province
District capitals in Vietnam